Callan Castle may refer to:

 Callan Castle (Atlanta), in Inman Park, Atlanta, U.S.
 Callan Castle, a fictional location in Thomas & Friends

See also
 Callan, County Kilkenny, Ireland